Isa Agim Eminhaziri (born 9 September 1987 in Gjakovë) is a Kosovar-Albanian footballer who plays for Liria Prizren in the Football Superleague of Kosovo.

Club career
In July 2019, Eminhaziri returned to Liria Prizren for the second time.

References

1987 births
Living people
Sportspeople from Gjakova
Association football midfielders
Kosovo Albanians
Kosovan men's footballers
Bilisht Sport players
KF Feronikeli players
KS Pogradeci players
KF Teuta Durrës players
Besa Kavajë players
KF Liria players
SC Gjilani players
KF Drenica players
KF KEK players
Football Superleague of Kosovo players
Kategoria Superiore players
Kategoria e Parë players
Kosovan expatriate footballers
Expatriate footballers in Albania
Kosovan expatriate sportspeople in Albania